Toivo Pawlo (25 December 1917 – 14 June 1979) was a Swedish film actor. He appeared in 50 films between 1943 and 1978. At the 12th Guldbagge Awards he won the award for Best Actor for his role in the film Hello Baby.

Selected filmography

 Young Blood (1943)
 The Girl and the Devil (1944)
 Crime and Punishment (1945)
 Number 17 (1949)
 Count Svensson (1951)
 Blue Sky (1955)
 When the Mills are Running (1956)
 Rabies (1958)
 The Magician (1958)
 A Lion in Town (1959)
 The Die Is Cast (1960) 
 Hide and Seek (1963)
 Made in Sweden (1969)
 Sagan om Karl-Bertil Jonssons Julafton (1975)
 Hello Baby (1976)

References

External links

1917 births
1979 deaths
Swedish male film actors
Male actors from London
Eugene O'Neill Award winners
Best Actor Guldbagge Award winners
20th-century Swedish male actors